István Pintér ( January 25, 1831 – December 11, 1875) was a Hungarian Slovene writer and court in Felsőszölnök.

He was born and lived in the Jánoshegy (locally: Janošovi brejg), near Felsőszölnök. His parents were István Pintér and Mária Bajzék. 

About 1864, he wrote his cantor-book. This hymnal contains religious folk songs in the Prekmurje dialect. The oldest hymn is Krisztus nam je od szmrti sztao (Christ Is Risen from the Dead) from the manuscript of Stična Monastery in Styria.

Literature 
 Marija Kozar/Kozár Mária: Etnološki slovar Slovencev na Madžarskem / A Magyarországi Szlovének néprajzi szótára, Monošter-Szombathely 1996. 
 Franci Just: Besede iz Porabja, besede za Porabja, Franc-Franc, Murska Sobota 2003. 

Slovenian writers and poets in Hungary
1831 births
1875 deaths